John V. Evans may refer to:

 John Evans (Idaho governor) (1925–2014), American politician from Idaho
 John V. Evans (astronomer) (born 1933), British-American radio astronomer